31Knots is an American math rock band based in Portland, Oregon, United States, by guitarist Joe Haege and bassist Jay Winebrenner. It was founded in Chicago in 1997. In 1998 the band added Joe Kelly as a drummer; in 2003 he left and was replaced by Jay Pellicci of Dilute. Early albums explored the limits of a guitar-bass-drums rock trio, while more recent work has added samples, piano, and increasingly skewed songwriting that push 31Knots' music into an ever more difficult to categorize genre. They have toured Europe several times since 2004.

Discography

Albums
Algut Allbrain (1997 - RangHok)
Climax / Anti-Climax (Jan 4, 2000 - RangHok / Mar 19, 2009 (Re-Release) - Polyvinyl)
A Word Is Also a Picture of a Word (Oct 1, 2002 - 54º40' or Fight!)
It Was High Time To Escape (Sep 2, 2003 - 54º40' or Fight!)
Talk Like Blood (Oct 11, 2005 - Own Records (Europe) / Polyvinyl (US))
The Days and Nights of Everything Anywhere (Mar 6, 2007 - Polyvinyl)
Worried Well (Aug 19, 2008 - Polyvinyl)
Trump Harm (Jun 7, 2011 - Polyvinyl)

EPs
The Rehearsal Dinner EP (Mar 12, 2002 - 54º40' or Fight!)
The Curse of the Longest Day (Nov 1, 2004 - Own Records (Europe) / Jul 12, 2005 - Polyvinyl (US))
ep:Polemics (Nov 7, 2006 - Polyvinyl)

References

External links
Official website
31Knots on MySpace
Own Records official website

Polyvinyl Record Co. artists
Indie rock musical groups from Oregon
Math rock groups
Musical groups from Portland, Oregon
1997 establishments in Illinois
Musical groups established in 1997